Tanty (Dargwa: ТIантIи) is a rural locality (a selo) in Akushinsky District, Republic of Dagestan, Russia. The population was 824 as of 2010. There are 8 streets.

Geography 
Tanty is located 16 km south of Akusha (the district's administrative centre) by road. Urgani is the nearest rural locality.

References 

Rural localities in Akushinsky District